The Bridge Pavilion is a building designed by British-Iraqi architect Zaha Hadid that was constructed for the Expo 2008 in Zaragoza (Spain) as one of its main landmarks. The new bridge is, at the same time, a multi-level exhibition area; 10,000 visitors per hour were expected to frequent the Pavilion during world exhibition.

Hadid chose fibre glass reinforced concrete from Austrian company Rieder to envelope the bridge: she covered the outer skin of the building with 29,000 triangles of fibreC in different shades of grey.

During the Expo 2008, the Bridge Pavilion hosted an exposition called Water – a unique resource, designed by Ralph Appelbaum Associates. When the Expo was over, the building was purchased by the local savings bank Ibercaja to use it as a site for expositions.

External links
Zaragoza Bridge Pavilion
Official site
Bridge Pavilion
Image fibreC

World's fair architecture in Zaragoza
Zaha Hadid buildings
Postmodern architecture
Modernist architecture in Spain
Bridges completed in 2008
Cultural infrastructure completed in 2008
Neo-futurism architecture